The 2008 Carolina Panthers season was the franchise's 14th season in the National Football League.  They entered the season and improved on their 7–9 record from 2007, winning the NFC South for the first time since 2003 and earning their first playoff berth since 2005. Their 12–4 finish tied their then-best record in franchise history, which occurred in the 1996 season, and later on tied in 2013; however, this would be surpassed by the 2015 club. The second-seeded Panthers were upset at home in the divisional playoffs by the eventual NFC Champion Arizona Cardinals, 33–13.

Offseason

NFL Draft

Free agent signings

Roster releases

Staff

Final roster

Schedule

Preseason

Regular season

Postseason

Standings

Regular season results

Week 1: at San Diego Chargers

The Carolina Panthers and San Diego Chargers were locked in a defensive battle in the first quarter. John Kasay made three field goals (44, 33, 30) while Philip Rivers connected with Chris Chambers on a 44-yard pass to score. At halftime the score was 9–7, in favor of the Panthers. Nate Kaeding hit a 27-yard field goal to put the Chargers up 10–9, before Chris Gamble recovered a fumble by TE Antonio Gates, giving the Panthers a lead of 16–10. Another John Kasay field goal would make it a two-score game, before Philip Rivers would hit Antonio Gates and Vincent Jackson for 24 and 5-yard touchdown passes, respectively. With 0:02 on the game clock, Panthers quarterback Jake Delhomme hit tight end Dante Rosario on a 14-yard pass to give the Panthers the win and a 1–0 start.

Week 2: vs. Chicago Bears

The Bears and Panthers squared off and it was defensive. The lone score of the first quarter came when Brandon Lloyd recovered a blocked punt and took it nine yards to score. Each team was able to score a field goal as Robbie Gould and John Kasay hit field goals from 26 and 37 yards, respectively. Jason McKie scored a touchdown for the Bears to open the second half, and John Kasay nailed a 45-yard field goal. Jonathan Stewart was able to get into the endzone for his first career touchdown. In the fourth quarter, another Jonathan Stewart run gave the Carolina Panthers the lead and eventually, the victory. 

With the win, the Panthers improved to 2–0.

Also, WR Muhsin Muhammad (5 receptions for 59 yards) became the 29th player in NFL history to amass 10,000 career receiving yards.

Week 3: at Minnesota Vikings

Coming off their home win over the Bears, the Panthers flew to the Hubert H. Humphrey Metrodome for a Week 3 duel with the Minnesota Vikings.  This game would also be WR Steve Smith's first game of the year, coming off his 2-game suspension.

In the first quarter, Carolina got the early lead with kicker John Kasay getting a 43-yard field goal.  In the second quarter, the Panthers increased their lead with rookie RB Jonathan Stewart getting a 2-yard TD run.  The Vikings responded with kicker Ryan Longwell's 28-yard field goal and CB Antoine Winfield returning a fumble 19 yards for a touchdown.  In the third quarter, Minnesota took the lead with QB Gus Frerotte completing a 34-yard TD pass to TE Visanthe Shiancoe.  In the fourth quarter, the Vikings sealed the win with Longwell nailing a 32-yard field goal.

With the loss, Carolina fell to 2–1.

Week 4: vs. Atlanta Falcons

Hoping to rebound from their road loss to the Vikings, the Panthers went home for a Week 4 NFC South duel with the Atlanta Falcons.  In the first quarter, Carolina pounced first with rookie RB Jonathan Stewart getting an 8-yard TD run.  The Falcons responded with kicker Jason Elam getting a 33-yard field goal.  In the second quarter, Atlanta crept closer as Elam kicked a 33-yard field goal.  Carolina would reply with QB Jake Delhomme completing a 56-yard TD pass to WR Steve Smith.  The Falcons closed out the half with Elam getting a 44-yard field goal.

In the third quarter, the Panthers answered with kicker John Kasay nailing a 44-yard field goal.  In the fourth quarter, Carolina closed the game out with Delhomme completing a 36-yard TD pass to WR Muhsin Muhammad.

With the win, the Panthers improved to 3–1.

During the game, Muhsin Muhammad (8 receptions for 147 yards and a touchdown) became the Panthers All-Time WR Leader in Receptions (600) and TD Receptions (45).

Week 5: vs. Kansas City Chiefs

Coming off their divisional win over the Falcons, the Panthers stayed at home for a Week 5 interconference duel with the Kansas City Chiefs.  In the first quarter, Carolina pounced first as RB DeAngelo Williams got a 10-yard TD run.  In the second quarter, the Panthers continued its attack as Williams caught a 25-yard TD pass from QB Jake Delhomme and even got a 32-yard TD run.  In the third quarter, Carolina increased its lead with kicker John Kasay getting a 32-yard field goal, along with Delhomme completing a 47-yard TD pass to WR Muhsin Muhammad.  In the fourth quarter, the Panthers sealed their shutout win with Kasay nailing a 43-yard field goal.

With the win, Carolina improved to 4–1.

Week 6: at Tampa Bay Buccaneers

Coming off their shutout home win over the Chiefs, the Panthers flew to Raymond James Stadium for a Week 6 NFC South duel with Tampa Bay Buccaneers.  In the first quarter, Carolina trailed early as Buccaneers LB Geno Hayes returned a blocked punt 22 yards for a touchdown, along with QB Jeff Garcia completing a 2-yard TD pass to TE Alex Smith.  In the second quarter, the Panthers got on the board with kicker John Kasay getting a 20-yard field goal, yet Tampa Bay answered with kicker Matt Bryant getting a 37-yard field goal.  In the third quarter, the Buccaneers increased their lead as Bryant nailed a 49-yard field goal.  In the fourth quarter, Tampa Bay sealed the win with RB Earnest Graham getting a 1-yard TD run.

With the loss, Carolina fell to 4–2.

Week 7: vs. New Orleans Saints

Hoping to rebound from their divisional road loss to the Buccaneers, the Panthers went home for a Week 7 NFC South duel with the New Orleans Saints.  In the first quarter, Carolina pounced first as kicker John Kasay got a 39-yard field goal.  In the second quarter, the Saints took the lead as FB Mike Karney got a 1-yard TD run.  The Panthers regained the lead as rookie RB Jonathan Stewart got an 18-yard TD run, along with Kasay getting a 48-yard field goal.

In the third quarter, Carolina continued its domination as QB Jake Delhomme completed a 39-yard TD pass to WR Steve Smith, along with a 4-yard TD pass to RB DeAngelo Williams.  In the fourth quarter, the Panthers closed out the game as Kasay nailed a 28-yard field goal.

With the win, Carolina improved to 5–2.

Week 8: vs. Arizona Cardinals

Coming off their win over the Saints, the Panthers stayed at home for a Week 8 duel with the Arizona Cardinals.  In the first quarter, Carolina trailed early as Cardinals kicker Neil Rackers got a 21-yard field goal.  In the second quarter, Arizona increased its lead as QB Kurt Warner completed a 5-yard TD pass to WR Anquan Boldin.  The Panthers got on the board with kicker John Kasay getting a 23-yard field goal.

In the third quarter, the Cardinals increased their lead as RB Tim Hightower got a 2-yard TD run.  Carolina started to rally as RB DeAngelo Williams got a 15-yard TD run, while QB Jake Delhomme completed an 18-yard TD pass to WR Steve Smith.  Arizona responded with Warner completing a 2-yard TD pass to Boldin (with a failed PAT), yet the Panthers got the lead with Delhomme hooking up with Smith again on a 65-yard TD pass.  In the fourth quarter, Carolina completed its rally as Kasay nailed a 50-yard field goal.

With the win, the Panthers went into their bye week at 6–2.

Week 10: at Oakland Raiders

Coming off their bye week, the Panthers flew to Oakland–Alameda County Coliseum for a Week 10 interconference duel with the Oakland Raiders.  In the first quarter, Carolina pounced first as QB Jake Delhomme completed a 3-yard TD pass to WR Muhsin Muhammad.  In the second quarter, the Panthers increased their lead as RB DeAngelo Williams got a 69-yard TD run.  In the third quarter, the Raiders responded with kicker Sebastian Janikowski getting a 38-yard and a 45-yard field goal.  In the fourth quarter, Carolina closed the game out with kicker John Kasay nailing a 32-yard field goal.

With the win, the Panthers improved to 7–2.

Week 11: vs. Detroit Lions

Coming off their road win over the Raiders, the Panthers went home for a Week 11 duel with the winless Detroit Lions.  In the first quarter, Carolina trailed early as Lions QB Daunte Culpepper completed a 29-yard TD pass to WR Calvin Johnson.  In the second quarter, Detroit increased their lead as kicker Jason Hanson got a 40-yard field goal.  The Panthers got on the board as QB Jake Delhomme completed a 15-yard TD pass to TE Jeff King.  The Lions would answer with Hanson making a 56-yard field goal, yet Carolina took the lead with RB DeAngelo Williams getting a 56-yard TD run, while rookie RB Jonathan Stewart got a 22-yard TD run.  Detroit ended the half with Hanson getting a 27-yard field goal.

In the third quarter, the Panthers increased their lead as kicker John Kasay nailed a 29-yard field goal.  In the fourth quarter, the Lions tried to rally as Culpepper got a 1-yard TD run (with a failed 2-point conversion), yet Carolina pulled away with Williams getting a 4-yard TD run.

With the win, the Panthers improved to 8–2.

Week 12: at Atlanta Falcons

Coming off their record-setting win over the Lions, the Panthers flew to the Georgia Dome for a Week 12 NFC South rematch with the Atlanta Falcons.  In the first quarter, Carolina trailed early as Falcons kicker Jason Elam made a 23-yard field goal, while WR Harry Douglas got a 7-yard TD run.  In the second quarter, the Panthers continued to trail as RB Michael Turner got a 1-yard TD run.  Carolina would close out the half as kicker John Kasay got a 23-yard field goal.

In the third quarter, the Panthers began to make the game interesting. RB DeAngelo Williams would get a 5-yard TD run, followed by Kasay nailing a 21-yard field goal. In the fourth quarter, Atlanta replied with Turner getting a 4-yard TD run.  Carolina answered with QB Jake Delhomme getting a 12-yard TD run (followed up by Williams' 2-point conversion run), but the Falcons responded with Turner's 1-yard TD run, along with Douglas returning a punt 61 yards for a touchdown.  The Panthers tried to come back as Delhomme completed a 16-yard TD pass to WR Muhsin Muhammad.  However, Atlanta pulled away as Turner got a 16-yard TD run.

With the loss, Carolina fell to 8–3.

Week 13: at Green Bay Packers

Hoping to rebound from their divisional road loss to the Falcons, the Panthers flew to Lambeau Field for a Week 13 duel with the Green Bay Packers.  In the first quarter, Carolina pounced first as RB DeAngelo Williams got a 1-yard TD run.  In the second quarter, the Packers responded with kicker Mason Crosby getting a 32-yard field goal.  The Panthers would answer with QB Jake Delhomme getting a 1-yard TD run.  Green Bay replied with QB Aaron Rodgers completing a 6-yard TD pass to WR Donald Driver, yet Carolina ended the half with Williams getting another 1-yard TD run.

In the third quarter, the Packers tied the game as Crosby made a 44-yard field goal, while Rodgers completed a 5-yard TD pass to TE Donald Lee (along with a successful 2-point conversion pass to WR Greg Jennings).  In the fourth quarter, Green Bay took the lead as Rodgers hooked up with Jennings on a 21-yard TD pass, yet the Panthers answered with Williams getting his third 1-yard TD run.  The Packers would retake the lead as Crosby nailed a 19-yard field goal, yet Carolina sealed the victory with Williams getting his fourth 1-yard TD run (setting the single-game franchise record for the most rushing touchdowns).

With the win, the Panthers improved to 9–3.

Week 14: vs. Tampa Bay Buccaneers

The Panthers would run wild, literally, as they would amass a team record 299 yards on the ground (186 of them from DeAngelo Williams, 115 from Jonathan Stewart).  Both Stewart and Williams had two touchdowns apiece, as Tampa Bay failed to tackle the dynamic duo.  Steve Smith also had a good day, adding 117 yards and a TD.  Although Jake Delhomme was intercepted twice, Tampa was unable to fully capitalize, despite a career day for Antonio Bryant, who finished with 200 yards and two scores.

With this victory, Carolina avenged its defeat by Tampa earlier in the season and gained sole possession of first place in the NFC South at 10–3.

Week 15: vs. Denver Broncos

Coming off from their divisional win over the Buccaneers, the Panthers stayed at home for a Week 15 interconference duel with the Denver Broncos. In the first quarter, Carolina trailed early as Broncos QB Jay Cutler completed a 7-yard TD pass to RB P.J. Pope. Carolina soon responded with QB Jake Delhomme completing a 15-yard TD pass to WR Steve Smith. Denver would retake the lead with kicker Matt Prater nailing a 43-yard field goal, yet Carolina answered as kicker John Kasay ties the game with a 39-yard field goal. In the second quarter, Carolina took the lead with rookie RB Jonathan Stewart getting a 2-yard TD run. Carolina closed out the half with Kasay nailing a 44-yard field goal.

In the third quarter, Carolina increased its lead with RB DeAngelo Williams's 56-yard TD run for the only score of the period. In the fourth quarter, Carolina sealed the win with Kasay's 42-yard field goal.

With the win, Carolina improves to 11–3. This was the last time the Panthers beat the Broncos until 2022.

Week 16: at New York Giants

Coming off their home win over the Broncos, the Panthers flew to Giants Stadium for a crucial Week 16 battle with the defending Super Bowl champion New York Giants, where the winner would lock up the NFC's #1 seed. This was also Carolina's second appearance on NBC's Sunday Night Football.

Despite trailing early in the first quarter through Giants kicker John Carney's 32-yard field goal, Carolina would respond with running back DeAngelo Williams' 13-yard touchdown run.  New York would regain the lead in the second quarter with running back Brandon Jacobs getting a 2-yard touchdown run, yet the Panthers answered right back with Williams getting a 5-yard and a 1-yard touchdown run.  The Giants would close out the first half with Carney nailing a 35-yard field goal.

In the third quarter, New York was gaining ground with quarterback Eli Manning completing a 4-yard touchdown pass to tight end Kevin Boss.  Carolina would reply in the fourth quarter with Williams getting a 30-yard touchdown run.  However, the Giants would tie the game with Jacobs getting a 1-yard touchdown run (followed by Manning's 2-point conversion pass to wide receiver Domenik Hixon).  The Panthers would get a late-game drive going and tried to end the game with kicker John Kasay, but his 50-yard attempt sailed wide left.  In overtime, New York would take their second possession and end the game with Jacobs' 2-yard touchdown run.

Despite falling to 11–4, Carolina would get a playoff berth, due in part to the Cowboys losing to the Ravens.

Week 17: at New Orleans Saints

With the division title on the line, the Panthers flew to the Louisiana Superdome for a Week 17 NFC South rematch with the New Orleans Saints.  Carolina would get the early first quarter lead as kicker John Kasay got a 45-yard and a 26-yard field goal.  The Saints would respond in the second quarter with kicker Garrett Hartley's 21-yard field goal.  Afterwards, the Panthers would get a big lead as Kasay made a 34-yard field goal, quarterback Jake Delhomme completed an 8-yard touchdown pass to wide receiver Muhsin Muhammad, and cornerback Dante Wesley returning a fumble 12 yards for a touchdown.  New Orleans would end the half with quarterback Drew Brees completing a 26-yard touchdown pass to wide receiver Marques Colston.

In the third quarter, Carolina would add onto their lead with rookie running back Jonathan Stewart's 2-yard touchdown run.  However, in the fourth quarter, the Saints rallied to take the lead as Brees completed a 7-yard touchdown pass to wide receiver Robert Meachem, along with a 9-yard and a 13-yard touchdown pass to wide receiver Lance Moore.  Fortunately, the Panthers got the last laugh as Kasay nailed the game-winning 42-yard field goal.

With the win, not only did Carolina close out the regular season at 12–4, but they also won the NFC South division crown and the NFC's #2 seed.

Playoffs

NFC Divisional Round: vs. Arizona Cardinals

Entering the postseason as the NFC's #2 seed, the Panthers began their playoff run at home in the NFC Divisional round against the #4 Arizona Cardinals, in a rematch of their Week 8 contest.

Carolina would get off to a fast first quarter start as rookie running back Jonathan Stewart got a 9-yard touchdown run.  However, the Cardinals responded with quarterback Kurt Warner completing a 3-yard touchdown pass to running back Tim Hightower, followed by running back Edgerrin James' 4-yard touchdown run.  Arizona would take a huge lead in the second quarter as kicker Neil Rackers got a 49-yard and a 30-yard field goal, followed by Warner's 29-yard touchdown pass to wide receiver Larry Fitzgerald.

In the third quarter, the Cardinals would add onto their grand lead as Rackers made a 33-yard field goal.  Arizona would end its dominating night in the fourth quarter as Rackers nailed a 20-yard field goal.  The Panthers would end the game's scoring with quarterback Jake Delhomme completing an 8-yard touchdown pass to wide receiver Steve Smith.

With the disappointing loss, Carolina's season ended with an overall record of 12–5.

The Panthers' offense was plagued by Delhomme's 6 turnovers (5 interceptions and a fumble), Smith being limited to 2 catches for 43 yards & a touchdown, and the running back duo of Williams and Stewart being held to 74 combined rushing yards.

References

External links

 Panthers official web site
 Panthers team page on NFL.com

Carolina Panthers
Carolina Panthers seasons
NFC South championship seasons
Carolina